Chul Bolagh (also Romanized as Chūl Bolāgh; also known as Chel Bolāgh, Chol Bolāgh, Chulāgh, Chūl Bolākh, and Chul Bulāq) is a village in Zarrineh Rural District, Karaftu District, Divandarreh County, Kurdistan Province, Iran. At the 2006 census, its population was 383, in 71 families. The village is populated by Kurds.

References 

Towns and villages in Divandarreh County
Kurdish settlements in Kurdistan Province